Mirnes Becirovic (born 10 January 1989) is an Austrian footballer who played in the First League for SKN St. Pölten and Vienna. He currently plays for Floridsdorfer AC.

References

External links
 Profile - ÖFB

1989 births
Living people
People from Brčko District
Association football midfielders
Austrian footballers
Austria youth international footballers
SKN St. Pölten players
First Vienna FC players
SK Austria Klagenfurt players
Floridsdorfer AC players
2. Liga (Austria) players
Austrian Regionalliga players